This is a list of UMass Minutemen football players in the NFL draft.

Key

Selections

References

UMass

UMass Minutemen NFL draft